Sokolac is a municipality of the city of Istočno Sarajevo located in Republika Srpska, an entity of Bosnia and Herzegovina. As of 2013, it has a population of 12,021 inhabitants, while the town of Sokolac has a population of 5,919 inhabitants.

Demographics

Population

Ethnic composition

Economy
Sokolac is an important intersection for regional transport routes. The roads that intersect in Sokolac are between Sarajevo and the Adriatic Sea, Belgrade, Užice, Banja Luka and Bijeljina.

Economic preview
The following table gives a preview of total number of registered people employed in legal entities per their core activity (as of 2018):

Sport
The local OFK Glasinac 2011's predecessor club FK Glasinac Sokolac has played two seasons in the country's top level Premier League of Bosnia and Herzegovina. They now play in the third tier.

International cooperation
List of Sokolac's sister and twin cities:

  Hohenburg
  Ormylia
  Arilje
  Goraždevac
  Obrenovac

Friendship agreement:
  Nikšić

See also
 Municipalities of Republika Srpska

References

External links

Interview with Milovan Bjelica, the Mayor of Sokolac
History, politics and much more

 
Populated places in Sokolac
Romanija plateau
Cities and towns in Republika Srpska